Fielden William "Billy" Mitts (1919–1973) was an American attorney and Democratic Party politician from Mississippi. He served in the Mississippi State Senate from 1960 to 1964.

Biography 
Mitts was born to F. W. "Buddy" Mitts and his wife, and grew up in Clarke County, Mississippi. He attended Mississippi State University, where he was a cheerleader and the student body president. He graduated from Mississippi State in 1942.

In 1959, he was elected as the state senator for Clarke and Jasper counties. He ran for re-election in 1963, when the 40th district had been redrawn to include Wayne County in place of Jasper County. He lost in the first round of primary elections to W. Vol "Bill" Jones.

Mitts was opposed to racial integration of schools in Mississippi. He is known for his role in trying to prevent the 1962–63 Mississippi State Bulldogs men's basketball team from playing in the NCAA tournament against the Loyola Ramblers, a team from Chicago which featured four black starting players. Mitts and another state senator, B. W. Lawson, obtained a temporary injunction to restrain the team within the state ahead of gameday. However, this injunction was never served before the team's plane departed for the game, and it was later dissolved for lacking legal basis. The game between the Bulldogs and the Ramblers thus went on as planned, and is now known as the Game of Change.

Mitts died on April 1, 1973 in Meridian Hospital. His funeral was held on April 3, and he was buried in Enterprise Cemetery in Enterprise, Mississippi.

Personal life 
He married Lugennia White from Macon, Georgia. He had one son and three daughters, including Chandler Mitts, who ran for the Mississippi House of Representatives twice in the 1990s.

References

See also 
 Russell Fox (politician), a state representative who also opposed NCAA tournament participation
 Walter Hester, a state representative who also opposed NCAA tournament participation

People from Clarke County, Mississippi
Mississippi state senators
1919 births
1973 deaths
Mississippi State University alumni